Masoprocol is an antineoplastic drug used to treat skin growths caused by sun exposure. A form of nordihydroguaiaretic acid that is taken by mouth is being studied in the treatment of prostate cancer. 

Also called nordihydroguaiaretic acid, NDGA, and actinex.

Mechanism
Nordihydroguaiaretic acid is an antioxidant, and it may block certain enzymes needed for tumor growth. 

It is a lipoxygenase inhibitor.

References

External links 
  MedlinePlus Drug Information
 Actinex entry in the public domain NCI Cancer Dictionary

Antineoplastic drugs
Catechols